The NER Class O (LNER Class G5) was a class of 0-4-4T steam locomotives of the North Eastern Railway, designed by the company's Chief Engineer, Wilson Worsdell. They all survived into British Railways ownership in 1948 and their BR numbers were 67240-67349. They were withdrawn between 1950 and 1958.

Accidents and incidents
In July 1957, locomotive No. No. 67338 was used for a series of tests into the performance of concrete sleepers when trains were derailed. These tests took place between Halifax and Keighley, Yorkshire.

Preservation 
None of the G5s was preserved, although a new build is in the works at Shildon. It will be built for use on various heritage lines.

References

0-4-4T locomotives
O
Railway locomotives introduced in 1894
Standard gauge steam locomotives of Great Britain
Scrapped locomotives
Passenger locomotives